Rail transport in Brunei did not play an important role during the development of Brunei.

Narrow gauge railway of Brooketon Colliery 

Brooketon Colliery in the sub-district Serasa operated a 2.5 km long narrow gauge railway with the unusual gauge of 711 mm (2 ft 4 in) from the colliery to the deepwater harbour near Muara. Wooden rails were used, until steel rails were laid, so that two 0-4-0 steam locomotives of Andrew Barclay Sons & Co. could be used.

The locomotive with the serial No 696 was built in 1891 and had an inner frame, a wheel diameter of 559 mm (1 ft 10 in), outer cylinders with a capacity of 178 × 356 mm (7 × 14 in) and a height of only 1753 mm (5 ft 9 in), to be used in the 1829 mm (6 ft) high mine shaft. She had the name MARGUERITE REINE after Sir Charles Brookes' French wife Margaret de Windt. An identical Barclay locomotive with the serial No 815 was built in 1897 and was named BROOKETON. It was despatched in January 1898 from Glasgow.

The rail track was nearly completely lifted, but there are some mine shafts, overgrown remains of tracks and locomotives, which are protected under the Antiquities and Treasure Trove Act of Brunei Darussalam. The department of museums of Brunei plans, to exhibit them in an open-air museum, to support eco-tourism.

Between 1888 and 1924 approximately 650.000 t of Brooketon coal was transported, which was on high demand by the steam boats during their stop-over on the lucrative trip from  India to China. The colliery and its railway were decommissioned by 1924. During World War II the Japanese operated the coal mine once again for local use.

Narrow gauge railway Seria–Badas 
The alignment of the railway with wooden rails was built by the British Malayan Petroleum Company (BMP, now Brunei Shell Petroleum), to transport water from a pumping station in Badas, which was operated by George William Percival Clark at the Sungai Belait River, to Seria. It was subsequently used, to transport pipeline tubes.

The employees of BMP hid during World War II the most important parts of the railway from the Japanese, who consequently couldn't operate it. After liberation by the 9th Division of the Australian Army the hidden parts re-appeared in July 1945, and the railway was quickly re-commissioned, to transport two 25-pound howitzers and their ammunition to Badas, to disperse Japanese troops, which were still in the area.

According to some reports, the railway was still being used in 1999. The tracks are still (2013) in use for transporting trees and as a walkway.

Industrial railway of Brunei LNG 
In the LNG port of Brunei LNG (BLNG) in Lumut, Brunei, a Joint Venture of the government of Brunei (50%), Shell Overseas Trading (25%) and Mitsubishi (25%), a broad gauge industrial railway is used with the unusual gauge of 1533 mm ( in).

Bemo Rail of Warmenhuizen in the Netherlands laid the track onto the pier for transporting workers and equipment to the platform, which is 4 km away from the coastline, at which tankers can be filled with LNG, because they cannot come closer to the coast because the water is very shallow. Bemo also supplied two battery operated rail vehicles made in 1993 and 1997/98, as well as a motorless passenger car and some flat cars for tools. The locomotives get their energy from batteries and are explosion proof, for instance with stainless steel wheels. They can transport 10 passengers each. The original description was RCE-15 (Rail Car Electric, 15 kN (1,5 t) pulling force). Now it has been renamed to BRE-15 (Bemo Rail Electric). The maximum speed ist 15 km/h. In 1999 the first locomotive was equipped, similarly to the second locomotive, with an AC asynchron motoro instead of the DC motor. Two older explosion proof rail cars and trailers were delivered by Alan Keef in England.

Trans Borneo Railway (planned) 
Sarawak, Brunei, Sabah and Kalimantan shall be connected, investing a budget of 33 billion US Dollar. Thereby coal, timber and other agricultural produce could be transported from the hinterland of Borneo to the harbour in Bandar Seri Begawan, and from there to world-wide destinations.

Steel import for railway and tramway tracks increased since 1994 from 283 t to 539 t in 2002 an. However, the import rate sank subsequently(2003–2015) to a lower value than in 1994. On 10 November 2016 a tender for land survey equipment for the standard gauge project was published by the Ministry for Public Works and Traffic.

Mass rapid transit 
Initial plans for a metro in Brunei have so far not been completed. The government of Brunei invited the Malaysian government-owned company Prasarana Malaysia on 18 April 2017, to develop a concept for a metro network.

References